Merophyas divulsana, also known as the lucerne leaf roller, is a species of moth of the family Tortricidae. It is found throughout Australia and has also been spotted in New Zealand.

The wingspan is about 15 mm.

The larvae are considered a pest on various crops and herbaceous garden plants, including Medicago sativa, Daucus carota, Lactuca sativa, Lonicera japonica, Sclerolaena muricata, Pelargonium x zonale, Mentha spicata and Rumex species.

References

	

Moths described in 1863
Archipini